The canton of Lanvallay is an administrative division of the Côtes-d'Armor department, northwestern France. It was created at the French canton reorganisation which came into effect in March 2015. Its seat is in Lanvallay.

It consists of the following communes:
 
Bobital
Brusvily
Calorguen
Les Champs-Géraux
Évran
Le Hinglé
Lanvallay
Pleudihen-sur-Rance
Plouasne
Le Quiou
Saint-André-des-Eaux
Saint-Carné
Saint-Hélen
Saint-Judoce
Saint-Juvat
Tréfumel
Trévron

References

Cantons of Côtes-d'Armor